Collyweston Quarries is a  biological Site of Special Scientific Interest in Easton on the Hill in Northamptonshire, south of Stamford. It is managed by the Wildlife Trust for Bedfordshire, Cambridgeshire and Northamptonshire.

This former limestone quarry is now rough grassland on Jurassic limestone. The flora is diverse, and more than a hundred flowering plants have been recorded, including wild thyme, dropwort, dyer's greenweed and clustered bellflower. There is a substantial butterfly population.

There is access from a footpath adjacent to a house called Deep Side on Stamford Road.

References

Sites of Special Scientific Interest in Northamptonshire